Lift Your Spirit is the third studio album by American musician Aloe Blacc. The album was released on October 25, 2013, through Interscope Records, the album was released in the United States on March 11, 2014 and April 7, 2014 in the United Kingdom. The album has charted in Austria, Germany and Switzerland. The album includes production and co-songwriting from DJ Khalil, Pharrell Williams, Elton John, Theron Feemster and Rock Mafia. Strings for the entire album were arranged and recorded by Daniel "Danny Keyz" Tannenbaum. The album received a nomination for the Grammy Award for Best R&B Album at the 57th Grammy Awards in 2015.

Background
In an interview with Billboard in the US he talked about his new album saying, "It's called 'Lift Your Spirit, and on I've got production by Pharrell Williams, the Rock Mafia, DJ Khalil -- and we're working on making a fantastic album that blends together a lot of different styles of music -- in sort of the same way we blended dance music and country on 'Wake Me Up!"

Singles
"Wake Me Up" was released as the lead single from the album on September 30, 2013. The song has charted in Austria, Belgium, France, Germany, Netherlands and Switzerland. In an interview with Billboard's Keith Caulfield at Sunday's American Music Awards, he revealed that even though the song doesn't officially include him as a featured artist like many electronic music songs, he isn't craving the extra attention, instead hoping it becomes a pleasant surprise for some people down the road, he said, "It's one of those things where it's bittersweet for the fans' sake; I want my fans to know that I'm doing something new" He is credited as a co-writer on the song, having come up with the lyrics on an airplane, he said, "I was thinking to myself, 'My life is a dream. Wake me up when it's over, when I walked into the session with Mike Einziger on guitar and Avicii, Mike was playing his guitar chords and these words... the way I sang them just felt right. We ended up recording it that night and I drove home listening to this acoustic version that Avicii eventually made into a fantastic hit. It's a wonderful experience."

"The Man" was released as the second single from the album on January 21, 2014 in the United States and March 30, 2014 in the United Kingdom. The song has peaked at number 8 on the US Billboard Hot 100 and number 1 on the UK Singles Chart. The song The Man copies the melody of Elton John's Your Song in the chorus.

"Can You Do This" was released as a single in late 2014. The video stars Kaley Cuoco and Kevin Hart.

Promotional singles
"Lift Your Spirit" was released as the free iTunes Single of the Week for the week of March 11, 2014 in the United States.

Critical reception

Upon the album's North American release, at Metacritic, which assigns a normalized rating out of 100 to reviews from mainstream critics, the album received an average score of 64, which indicates "generally favorable reviews", based on 13 reviews.

Commercial performance
On November 8, 2013 the album entered the Austrian Albums Chart at number 43. On November 10, 2013 the album entered the Swiss Albums Chart at number 22, it dropped to number 46 in its second week, it dropped to number 71 in its third week, it dropped to number 90 in its fourth week, on December 15, 2013 the album re-entered the chart at number 86. The album has peaked at number 16 on the German Albums Chart. On December 13, the album re-entered the Austrian Albums Chart at number 60. On March 31, 2014, the album entered the New Zealand Albums Chart at number 10, dropping to number 27 in its second week.

Track listing

US version

Charts

Weekly charts

Year-end charts

Release history

References

2013 albums
Albums produced by DJ Khalil
Albums produced by Pharrell Williams
Albums produced by Theron Feemster
Aloe Blacc albums
Interscope Geffen A&M Records albums
Interscope Records albums